Isaiah 63 is the sixty-third chapter of the Book of Isaiah in the Hebrew Bible or the Old Testament of the Christian Bible. This book contains the prophecies attributed to the prophet Isaiah, and is one of the Books of the Prophets. Chapters 56-66 are often referred to as Trito-Isaiah.

Text 
The original text was written in the Hebrew language. This chapter is divided into 19 verses.

Textual witnesses
Some early manuscripts containing the text of this chapter in Hebrew are of the Masoretic Text tradition, which includes the Codex Cairensis (895), the Petersburg Codex of the Prophets (916), Aleppo Codex (10th century), Codex Leningradensis (1008).

Fragments containing parts of this chapter were found among the Dead Sea Scrolls (3rd century BC or later): 
 1QIsaa: complete
 1QIsab: extant: verses 1‑9, 11‑19

There is also a translation into Koine Greek known as the Septuagint, made in the last few centuries BCE. Extant ancient manuscripts of the Septuagint version include Codex Vaticanus (B; B; 4th century), Codex Sinaiticus (S; BHK: S; 4th century), Codex Alexandrinus (A; A; 5th century) and Codex Marchalianus (Q; Q; 6th century).

Parashot
The parashah sections listed here are based on the Aleppo Codex. Isaiah 63 is a part of the Consolations (Isaiah 40–66). {P}: open parashah; {S}: closed parashah.
 {S} 63:1-6 {S} 63:7-19 [64:1-2 {S}]

Verse 1
Who is this that cometh from Edom,
 with dyed garments from Bozrah?
 this that is glorious in his apparel, 
 travelling in the greatness of his strength?
 I that speak in righteousness, 
 mighty to save.

Verse 16
 Doubtless thou art our father,
 though Abraham be ignorant of us,
 and Israel acknowledge us not:
 thou, O Lord, art our father, our redeemer;
 thy name is from everlasting.
Cross reference: Isaiah 64:8

See also

 Abraham
 Bozrah
 Edom
Related Bible parts: Isaiah 34, Isaiah 64

References

Bibliography

External links

Jewish
Isaiah 63 Hebrew with Parallel English

Christian
Isaiah 63 English Translation with Parallel Latin Vulgate 

63